Edley Dos Anjos Pereira Montoia (born 5 February 1994), commonly known as Vavá Pequeno (Small Vavá), is a São Toméan footballer who plays as a defender for Sporting Praia Cruz and the São Tomé and Príncipe national team.

International career
Vavá Pequeno made his international debut for São Tomé and Príncipe on 4 September 2019.

References

External links

1994 births
Living people
Association football defenders
São Tomé and Príncipe footballers
São Tomé and Príncipe international footballers
Sporting Praia Cruz players